Chunk (Chester P. Runk) is a fictional character appearing in comics published by DC Comics. He first appeared in The Flash (vol. 2) #9 (February 1988) and was created by Mike Baron and Jackson Guice.

Chester P. Runk appears in live-action by Brandon McKnight in the CW Arrowverse television series The Flash starting in the sixth season.

Fictional character biography
Maverick physicist and engineer Chester P. Runk had no living relatives. Chester was a child prodigy and an M.I.T. graduate, but he also had serious psychological problems. According to Cyborg, at the age of twenty-four, Runk had developed a "matter transmitting machine", a primitive long range teleportation device. Due to a lack of sensible safety procedures on Runk's part, his machine imploded and became a part of his body after his first test of its long range teleportation capabilities. The accident made him superstrong and resilient, and gave him the power to teleport anywhere he wished on Earth and off. He was also forced to physically absorb forty-seven times his own weight in superdense matter like diamonds, just to keep the machine from eating him or collapsing him down to a dimension lower than the one he had access to. Chester had become a human black hole. Runk came to the Flash's (Wally West) attention during a crime spree where he was seen literally eating diamonds to feed the machine. He was also seen stealing expensive high tech research equipment. Chunk appears to have been diagnosed as mentally unstable before the accident, and had been seeing a therapist named Jarret Parker for years.

The Void
Chester could access a local pocket dimension he called "the Void", a barren rocky waste that is home to strange prehistoric creatures. He had sent many people there over the three-year period since his accident, the first being Jarret Parker Ph.D., his former psychiatrist, and Karin Preus, a woman who had rejected his advances. Many dozens of innocent bystanders, many who were guilty only of annoying Chunk, were stranded and forced to eke a living out of the Void's severe landscape, by learning how to hunt the lizards, insects and giant winged reptiles that make their homes in the canyons. Some grew food using the guano of the winged reptiles to cultivate seeds taken from some of the many cars Chunk had taken. However, a majority of the victims Chunk sent into the void were murderers, sadists and criminals. Some of the roving bands of criminals had even turned to cannibalism.  Chester brought Wally there at the end of their second fight where he joined up with a group of decent-minded survivors. Wally soon convinced Chunk that he would be hailed for his scientific discovery if he would just send all his victims back to Earth. Chester revealed to Wally that he could not control himself when he left the Void; the partially formed singularity simply threw him out whenever it got hungry. Chester agreed to do so, and further police investigations declared him innocent of any charges.

He was unable to bring all of his victims back right away, though he never stopped trying. Finally, they all returned to Earth during a going away party thrown by the Rogues for Captain Cold. Wally West had been invited as a gag by the Trickster, and he arrived with Chunk, but the victims destroyed the hotel ballroom where the party was being held, nearly instigating a riot in the process. Wally and The Rogues were able to assist the police in subduing the mob before they got out of hand.

In a backup story in The Flash (vol. 2) Annual #2, a team of scientists approaches Chunk, asking to study the Void. Chunk sends one of the scientists there (humorously, the scientist was unprepared). As the scientist shifts through several dimensions, including the one Wally was in, one with razor-sharp spikes, and even one with no air, he returns to Earth relatively unharmed. He comments that there seemed to be a great interdimensional cataclysm, and Chunk's powers give him access to the remains. While this is a vague allusion to Crisis on Infinite Earths in which the DC Multiverse was destroyed, an official connection was never established.

Waste removal and other battles
"Chunk" later worked as a "waste removal specialist" because he believed "everyone has something they’d like to disappear". He was close friends with Wally West, and for a while employed Wally's mother as his secretary. Due to the wealth rolling in from his new business, he was able to buy Wally's former mansion, and moved into it along with a great deal of distantly related relatives. During this time, Chester is confronted with one of the few things he cannot remove, a large tumor from the brain of a very sick woman. Against her explanations of offering money, Chester explains that since he cannot actually see the tumor, he cannot remove it, and even if he were able to locate its exact position via x-rays, its disappearance would result in air rushing to fill the space it formerly inhabited, imploding the woman's head and killing her. The woman leaves, but not without help, a friendly visitor offers to give her a ride home.

Chester is engaged to Wally's ex-girlfriend Connie Noleski.

At some point during this period, he was allied with Amanda Waller's ad hoc team of Shadow Fighters, a diverse group brought together to fight Eclipso. Armed, he would join the final battle and even confront Eclipso face to face.

During Blacksmith's campaign to take over the Twin Cities, a rogue named Plunder shot Chunk with the only thing that could hurt him, a bullet laced with White Dwarf Matter (the substance Atom uses to shrink). The bullet wound opened up a vortex within his body, which sucked in everything around him, including people and light. The Central City Police Department called the KCPD in order to enlist the Flash's help, but he also ends up being sucked into the vortex. The situation was resolved when Wally recovered the bullet from the vortex in Chunk's body, which allowed him to quickly recover from his wound.

New 52
A New 52 version of Chunk is reintroduced as an classmate/friend of Wallace West/Kid Flash.

Powers and abilities
 Chester has the ability to absorb matter and expel it into a pocket dimension called the Void.
 He has also exhibited super-strength and limited invulnerability, and was able to easily survive being struck by a small commuter van, and then used his bare hands to rip off its doors.
 He's immune to most physical attacks; any weapons used against him are absorbed by his body.
 Chunk could unconsciously manipulate local gravimetric fields and draw matter towards him.
 The only ballistic projectiles that have been shown to hurt Chunk are bullets coated or laced with White Dwarf Star material, the same substance that allows the Atom to shrink.

Other versions
In this alternate future, Chunk works at S.T.A.R. Labs with Flash ally Tina McGee. He is aged and thinned by and finally killed by super-criminals in order to force cooperation from his colleagues. This future is framed in a present-day story where Chunk is invited as a special guest to a Flash-Day celebration.

In other media
Chester P. Runk appears in the Arrowverse series The Flash, portrayed by Brandon McKnight. Introduced in season six as a recurring character before being promoted to series regular for seasons seven, eight and nine, this version is a self-taught, brilliant, yet socially awkward non-overweight scientist capable of building sophisticated devices out of discard junk and scraps who was inspired by his inventor father Quincy P. Runk (portrayed by Milton Barnes), who died in a car accident in the 1990s. In his first appearance, Chester built a machine capable of opening black holes, only to accidentally create one that fused with his consciousness; leaving him in a catatonic state while the black hole itself opened in places that held great emotional significance to him. Eventually, the Flash rescues his consciousness from the black hole and places it back into his body, ending the threat. After stabilizing in a special machine built by S.T.A.R. Labs for several weeks, Runk is able to get his life back together as well as join Team Flash, providing assistance via his scientific expertise.

References

External links
Those who ride the lightning: Chunk Profile
Crimson Lightning  - An online index to the comic book adventures of the Flash.
GCD Project: Flash vol. 2 #9
DCU Guide: Chester P. Runk Profile
DCU Guide: Chester P. Runk Chronology
DCDatabase: Chunk
DCU Guide: Flash vol. 2 #177
DCU Guide: Eclipso - The Darkness Within #2
DCU Guide: Eclipso #11
Those who ride the lightning: Connie Nolenski
Flash Storylines: 1987–2006

Comics characters introduced in 1988
DC Comics male superheroes
African-American superheroes
Fictional inventors
Characters created by Mike Baron
Characters created by Jackson Guice
DC Comics characters with superhuman strength
DC Comics metahumans
Flash (comics) characters